Pa Mong is a tambon (subdistrict) of Det Udom District, in Ubon Ratchathani Province, Thailand. In 2021, it had a population of 4,940 people. Neighbouring subdistricts are (clockwise from the south) Na Charoen, Sa Saming, Na Suang, Na Rueang, and Mueang Det.

History
The area was administered from Na Suang and later became a subdistrict in its own right in 1988. Before 1997, the tambon was governed by the Subdistrict council of Pa Mong (สภาตำบลป่าโมง), which was later upgraded to the Subdistrict Administrative Organization of Pa Mong on February 23 that year.

Geography
The tambon is located in the northwestern region of the Det Udom district, on a plateau with a tropical savanna climate.

Administration
The tambon is divided into 9 administrative villages (mubans; หมู่บ้าน), one of which, Pa Mong Yai village, was further divided into two community groups (Mu; หมู่). The entire area is governed by the Subdistrict Administrative Organization of Pa Mong (องค์การบริหารส่วนตำบลป่าโมง; Pa Mong SAO).

The following is a list of the subdistrict's mubans, which roughly correspond to the villages, as of the 2021 census.

References

Tambon of Ubon Ratchathani Province